Elizabeth Gale Putnam (born November 28, 1984) is a Canadian former competitive pair skater. With Sean Wirtz, she is the 2006 Four Continents bronze medalist and a two-time (2003–04) Canadian national bronze medalist.

Personal life
Elizabeth Gale Putnam was born on November 28, 1984 in Toronto, Ontario, Canada. Her father died in October 2006.

Putnam is married to Canadian skater Patrick Chan.  The pair skated in a 2020 free-skate in Vancouver on an untouched plot of glaciered water.

Career
Putnam started skating in 1989. In addition to singles, she began training in pairs at age 15. She finished 9th with Mark Batka at the 2002 Canadian Championships.

Partnership with Wirtz
Putnam began training with Sean Wirtz in July 2002, following tryouts at the Toronto Cricket and Curling Club. The pair won bronze at the 2003 Canadian Championships and placed ninth at their first ISU Championship, the 2003 Four Continents in Beijing.

Putnam/Wirtz made their Grand Prix debut in the 2003–04 season, having received two assignments. After placing sixth at the 2003 Skate America and fifth at the 2003 Skate Canada International, they won bronze at a regular international, the 2003 Bofrost Cup on Ice. For the second season in a row, they took bronze at the Canadian Championships and finished 9th at the Four Continents Championships.

In the 2004–05 Grand Prix series, Putnam/Wirtz placed fifth at the 2004 Skate America and 8th at the 2004 Cup of Russia. They were fourth at both the 2005 Canadian Championships and 2005 Four Continents Championships.

Competing in the 2005–06 Grand Prix series, Putnam/Wirtz placed fourth at the 2005 Skate America and fifth at the 2005 Cup of Russia. After finishing fifth at the 2006 Canadian Championships, they won the bronze medal at the 2006 Four Continents Championships in Colorado Springs, Colorado.

Their training for the following season was delayed by a visa problem, which prevented Wirtz from returning to New Jersey for a month. Competing in the 2006–07 Grand Prix series, Putnam/Wirtz finished fourth at the 2006 Skate Canada International, two weeks after the death of Putnam's father, and then fourth at the 2006 Trophee Eric Bompard. They were sixth at the 2007 Canadian Nationals.

Their preparations for the 2007–08 season were hampered by injuries. After Wirtz recovered from a broken rib, sustained while skiing in spring 2007, he injured his foot and then the other foot, causing them to withdraw from both of their Grand Prix assignments. Tchernyshev's availability also decreased due to his show commitments. on August 28, 2007, Putnam/Wirtz announced the end of their partnership.

Later career
Putnam decided to return to single skating, training in Vancouver under Jill Marie Harvey and Joanne McLeod.
She later skated on cruise ships with adagio pairs partner Jonathan Poitras. In 2015, she appeared in a video skating on Widgeon Lake, near Coquitlam, at an altitude of 2,500 feet.

Programs
(with Wirtz)

Results
GP: Grand Prix

With Wirtz

With Batka

Single skating

References

External links

 
 

1984 births
Living people
Canadian female pair skaters
Four Continents Figure Skating Championships medalists
Figure skaters from Toronto